Flame, or Springfield Flame, is an outdoor  stainless steel sculpture of a flame by Devin Laurence Field, installed at the intersection of Gateway Street and Randy Papé Beltline, in Springfield, Oregon, United States. The $236,000 installation was paid for by a hotel tax.

See also

 Barometer (sculpture)
 Three Creeks, One Will

References

2016 establishments in Oregon
2016 sculptures
Buildings and structures in Lane County, Oregon
Outdoor sculptures in Oregon
Springfield, Oregon